The 2014 European Marathon Cup was the 10th edition of the quadrennial team marathon competition between European countries, which was held in Zürich, Switzerland on 16–17 August. The start and finish points were located on Bürkliplatz, and the route was set along a 10-kilometer circuit on the city streets. It was held in conjunction with the men's and women's individual marathon races at the 2014 European Athletics Championships.

Each national team was ranked on the sum of the finishing times of their top three athletes. Each team could enter more than three athletes, and non-scoring athletes of the top three teams were also awarded medals. In total, 92 athletes from 14 European countries entered the team race. Women participated in 11 national teams (45 participants) and men in 10 teams (47 participants). Each country could put up to 6 people in each of the two races. 

Russia won the men's team competition with a time of 6:46:04 hours, led by individual bronze medallist Aleksey Reunkov. Italy won the women's race with a time of 7:27:59, led by individual silver medallist Valeria Straneo.

Results

Men 

Participants in italics did not count towards the team's final time

Women 

Participants in italics did not count towards the team's final time

References

External links
 EAA web site

European Marathon Cup
Marathon Cup
International athletics competitions hosted by Switzerland
Marathons in Switzerland
Sports competitions in Zürich
European
Marathon Cup
European Marathon Cup